Central Division may refer to:

Sports
 Central Division (NBA), one of the six divisions in the National Basketball Association
 Central Division (NHL), one of the four divisions in the National Hockey League
 Central Division (MLS), former division in the MLS
 Pacific Division (AFL), one of the four divisions in the Arena Football League and formerly called the Central Division
 American League Central, division in Major League Baseball's American League
 National League Central, division in Major League Baseball's National League
 Queensland Rugby League Central Division, division in the Queensland Rugby League
 AFC North, National Football League division formerly known as "AFC Central"
 NFC North, National Football League division formerly known as "NFC Central"
 Central Division (cricket), a division of Minor League Cricket

Places
 Central District (Bandar Abbas County), Hormozgan Province, Iran
 Central Division, Fiji, one of Fiji's four provincial divisions
 Division of the Los Angeles Police Department#Central Division
 Central Land Division, a former cadastral division of Western Australia
 Kampala Central Division
 Quilon Division (Travancore), also known as Central Division, an administrative subdivision of the former princely state of Travancore.

Other
 Central Division (NS), a unit of Norfolk Southern Railway
 Central Division (web series), Internet series set in the downtown precinct of the LAPD.

See also 

 Eastern Division (disambiguation)
 Northern Division (disambiguation)
 Southern Division (disambiguation)
 Western Division (disambiguation)
 
 
 
 
 
 Division (disambiguation)
 Central (disambiguation)
 Center (disambiguation)
 Centre (disambiguation)